The France national korfball team is managed by the UFOLEP National Korfball Committee, representing France in korfball international competitions.

Tournament history

Current squad

Participation aux championnats du monde de beach korfball à Nador au Maroc au mois d'août 2022.

Du 31 octobre au 5 Novembre 2022 tournoi qualificatif pour les championnats du monde à Antalia en Turquie.

Équipe :

• Clément Chareyre n°10

• Mélanie Bourgaud n°6

• Nicolas Chareyre n°16

• Coralie Masclet n°5

• Guillaume Godorecci n°4

• Marie Perrier n°9

• Kevin Godorecci n°11

• Johanna Giordanni n°2

• Rémi Bonnard n°13

• Léa Mondon n°7

• Rudy Courbon n°8

• Morgane Parmentier n°15

• Baptiste Bernou n°14

• Céline Caltagirone n°3

National team in the 2009 European Bowl

 Coach: Denis Dancert

References 

National korfball teams
Korfball
Korfball in France